The Kuwaiti Emir Cup is the premier cup competition involving teams from the Kuwaiti Premier League and the Kuwaiti Division One league.

The 2010 edition is the 47th to be held.

Kuwait SC, are the defending champions of the cup competition.

The winners qualify for the 2011 AFC Cup.

First round

12 teams play a knockout tie. 6 clubs advance to the next round. Games played between 26 and 27 March.

Quarter finals

Semi finals

Final

2010
2009–10 in Kuwaiti football
2009–10 domestic association football cups